Brian McMahan (born January 26, 1969) is an American musician from Louisville, Kentucky. He was a guitarist and vocalist in the seminal rock bands Squirrel Bait and Slint. After the breakup of the latter in November 1990, he went on to play with Will Oldham on his project Palace Brothers. In 1994, McMahan formed The For Carnation which acted as a creative outlet; he remains the only permanent member of the band.  He was also part of King Kong, a band formed by original Slint bassist Ethan Buckler. McMahan plays guitar on the song "Why I'm So Unhappy" by Dntel.

References

External links 
 

American heavy metal guitarists
Living people
American electricians
Musicians from Louisville, Kentucky
Rock musicians from Kentucky
Singers from Kentucky
Math rock musicians
Post-hardcore musicians
Post-rock musicians
J. Graham Brown School alumni
Slint members
Guitarists from Kentucky
American male guitarists
Squirrel Bait members
The For Carnation members
King Kong (American band) members
1969 births